Events in the year 1968 in the Federal Republic of India.

Incumbents
 President of India – Zakir Hussain
 Prime Minister of India – Indira Gandhi
 Chief Justice of India – Kailas Nath Wanchoo (until 24 February), Mohammad Hidayatullah (starting 24 February)

Governors
 Andhra Pradesh – Pattom A. Thanu Pillai (until 11 April), Khandubhai Kasanji Desai (starting 11 April)
 Assam – Vishnu Sahay (until 17 April), Braj Kumar Nehru (starting 17 April)
 Bihar – Nityanand Kanungo 
 Gujarat – Shriman Narayan
 Haryana – Birendra Narayan Chakraborty 
 Jammu and Kashmir – Bhagwan Sahay 
 Karnataka – Gopal Swarup Pathak
 Kerala – Bhagwan Sahay (until 15 May), V. Viswanathan (starting 15 May)
 Madhya Pradesh – K. Chengalaraya Reddy 
 Maharashtra – P V Cherian 
 Nagaland – Vishnu Sahay (until 17 April), B.K. Nehru (starting 17 April)
 Odisha – Ajudhia Nath Khosla (until 30 January), Shaukatullah Shah Ansari (starting 30 January)
 Punjab – Dadappa Chintappa Pavate
 Rajasthan – Sardar Hukam Singh 
 Uttar Pradesh – Bezawada Gopala Reddy 
 West Bengal – Dharma Vira

Events
 National income - 398,141 million
 10 Jan - President of India withdraws emergency declared in 1962 as part of Sino-Indian War.
 20 Feb – The Beatles, Mia Farrow, and several other celebrities visit the ashram of Maharishi Mahesh Yogi in Rishikesh, India to study transcendental meditation.
 25 Feb - Rajeev Gandhi son of Indira Gandhi married an Italian named Edvige Antonio Maino.
 29 Feb - Auroville established in Pondicherry with presence of 124 countries. 
 1 April - Tata Consultancy Services established as Tata Computer Systems.
 12 April - 
 National Textile Corporation incorporated.
 Indira Gandhi announced in Rae Bareilly that India will not sign the Treaty on the Non-Proliferation of Nuclear Weapons.
 25 Dec - Kilvenmani massacre, 44 Dalits (untouchables) burnt to death in Kizhavenmani village, Tamil Nadu.
 Three-language formula introduced through National Policy on Education

Law
 18 Jan - Official Language resolution passed by both houses of Parliament. 
 16 May - Public Provident Fund introduced through an act by the Parliament of India.
 20 Aug - Enemy Property Act, 1968

Births
10 January Atul Khatri , comedian
21 January 
Sanjay Subrahmanyan, Carnatic vocalist.
Sundar C., actor and film director.
26 January  Ravi Teja, actor.
1 March – Kunjarani Devi, weightlifter.
19 April – Arshad Warsi, actor.
24 May – Raju Narayana Swamy, IAS officer.
14 June – Raj Thackeray, founder and president of Maharashtra Navnirman Sena.
2 July  Gautami, actress and politician.
16 July – Dhanraj Pillay, field hockey player.
20 July  S. J. Suryah, actor and director.
15 August
Anil Kumar Awana, politician.
Kailash Chandra Gahtori, politician.
23 August – KK, playback singer (died 2022).
18 September  Upendra, actor, director and politician.
29 September – Samir Soni, actor.
9 November – Neelam, former actress, jewellery designer.

Full date unknown
Abu Salem, mobster.

Deaths
A. R. Krishnashastry, writer, researcher and translator (born 1890).
19 November – Shri Rang Avadhoot, Saint who is regarded as an incarnation of Lord Dattatreya, (born 1898 in India)

See also 
 Bollywood films of 1968

References 

 
India
Years of the 20th century in India